On Tuesday, February 23, 1965, a small, localized tornado outbreak affected the southern Florida peninsula. At least four confirmed tornadoes touched down between 10 a.m.–1 p.m. EST (15:00–18:00 UTC); the strongest tornado moved through the Fort Lauderdale area and produced F3 damage on the Fujita scale, injuring six people. In addition, a F1 tornado also moved through northern Broward and southern Palm Beach counties. Two tornadoes also affected Lee County, producing F2 and F1 damage, respectively. 50 percent of the tornadoes attained strong (F2–F3) intensity.

Background

Impact

Confirmed tornadoes

A tornado reportedly damaged three residences in a pair of duplexes in Lehigh Acres, injuring a person with airborne glass, flaying the paint on a vehicle with pebbles, pulling up roofing, and scattering TV antennae, garbage cans, and awnings. However, this was officially classified as a severe thunderstorm wind.

Fort Lauderdale–Oakland Park, Florida

The second tornado touched down near Chula Vista and moved north-northeast across western portions of the city of Fort Lauderdale, affecting a  area, or 40 blocks, of the city. The small funnel was visible from a jetliner awaiting takeoff at Fort Lauderdale International Airport. Later, it briefly lifted prior to touching down in Oakland Park, and it dissipated northeast of Wilton Manors. Though three funnel clouds occurred along the path, only one tornado developed. One home was destroyed, while seven trailers, three cars, and a pair of trucks received severe damage. Most of the damage affected a marina and a trailer park, though damage to power poles left about 2,400 residents powerless. 75 small watercraft were damaged at the marina, along with the clubhouse. The width of the damage path averaged , but occasionally reached . The tornado caused six injuries, three of them due to airborne debris, and at least $140,000–$300,000 in damages (NCEI lists damages as $250,000). The tornado is officially estimated to have been an F3 event. It remains the second of only three F/EF3 tornadoes to affect Broward County since 1950; the others occurred on April 10, 1956, and March 1, 1980. However, tornado researcher Thomas P. Grazulis classified the tornado as an F2.

Non-tornadic effects
In addition to tornadoes, multiple funnel clouds occurred over at least two counties in southern Florida, and at least one waterspout touched down near West Palm Beach.

Aftermath and recovery

See also
List of North American tornadoes and tornado outbreaks
Hurricane Isbell tornado outbreak – One of the largest outbreaks on record in South Florida

Notes

References

Sources

F3 tornadoes
Tornadoes of 1965
Tornadoes in Florida
1965 in Florida
February 1965 events in the United States
1965 natural disasters in the United States